is an anime television series in the Lupin the Third franchise, produced at TMS Entertainment and directed by Eiji Suganuma and written by Takahiro Ōkura. It is the seventh anime adaptation of the Lupin III series created by Monkey Punch. Part 6 is produced at TMS Entertainment and directed by Eiji Suganuma, who previously directed the Lupin TV special Prisoner of the Past in 2019. It is written by Takahiro Ōkura with character design by Hirotaka Marufuji. The series will feature scripts from guest writers like Mamoru Oshii, Masaki Tsuji, Taku Ashibe, Kanae Minato, and Akio Higuchi. The series was announced by TMS on May 26, 2021, and aired with an episode 0 from October 10, 2021 to March 27, 2022 on Nippon TV and other NNS networks, in conjunction with the 50th anniversary celebration of the anime, with Part I having premiered on October 24, 1971. On August 20, 2021, Sentai Filmworks licensed the series for home video and streaming on Hidive. In the United States, Adult Swim's Toonami programming block premiered the series on April 17, 2022.


Episode list

Home media release

Japanese

English

See also

 Lupin the Third
 List of Lupin the Third Part I episodes
 List of Lupin the Third Part II episodes
 List of Lupin the Third Part III episodes
 List of Lupin the Third: The Woman Called Fujiko Mine episodes
 List of Lupin the 3rd Part IV: The Italian Adventure episodes
 List of Lupin the 3rd Part V: Misadventures in France episodes
 List of Lupin III television specials

Notes

References

External links
  
 

Lupin the 3rd Part 6
Lupin the 3rd Part 6